Paul Christopher Abrams (born October 3, 2000) is an American professional baseball shortstop for the Washington Nationals of Major League Baseball (MLB). He made his MLB debut in 2022 with the San Diego Padres.

Amateur career
Abrams attended Blessed Trinity Catholic High School in Roswell, Georgia. In 2018, he played for Team USA in the U-18 Pan-American Championships. As a senior in 2019, he was the Georgia Gatorade Baseball Player of the Year after hitting .431 with three home runs and 27 runs batted in (RBI). He committed to play college baseball at the University of Alabama.

Professional career

San Diego Padres

Abrams was considered one of the top prospects for the 2019 Major League Baseball draft. The San Diego Padres selected Abrams in the first round, with the sixth overall pick. He signed with the Padres on June 8 for $5.2 million, and was assigned to the Arizona League Padres, where he hit safely in his first twenty games. In August, he was promoted to the Fort Wayne TinCaps. He was placed on the injured list four days following the promotion due to a shoulder injury. Over 34 games between the two clubs, Abrams batted .393/.436/.647 with three home runs, 22 RBIs, and 15 stolen bases. Abrams did not play in a game in 2020 due to the cancellation of the minor league season because of the COVID-19 pandemic.

Abrams was assigned to the Double-A San Antonio Missions to begin the 2021 season. In June 2021, Abrams was selected to play in the All-Star Futures Game. In a June 30 game against the Corpus Christi Hooks, Abrams collided with second baseman Eguy Rosario at second base attempting to field a ground ball up the middle and had to be helped off of the field. On July 4, Abrams was diagnosed with a fractured left tibia and sprained medial collateral ligament, ending his 2021 season. In 42 games with the Missions, Abrams had hit .296/.363/.420 with two home runs and 23 RBIs.

On April 7, 2022, the Padres selected Abrams' contract, adding him to their Opening Day roster. He made his major league debut on April 8. On April 14, Abrams hit his first career home run off of Atlanta Braves starter Charlie Morton.

Washington Nationals

On August 2, 2022, Abrams, along with MacKenzie Gore, Luke Voit, Robert Hassell, James Wood, and Jarlín Susana were traded to the Washington Nationals in exchange for Juan Soto and Josh Bell.

References

External links

2000 births
Living people
People from Alpharetta, Georgia
Sportspeople from Fulton County, Georgia
Baseball players from Georgia (U.S. state)
Major League Baseball shortstops
United States national baseball team players
San Diego Padres players
Washington Nationals players
Arizona League Padres players
Fort Wayne TinCaps players
San Antonio Missions players
El Paso Chihuahuas players
Rochester Red Wings players